Dirt track racing is a type of auto racing performed on clay or dirt surfaced oval tracks in Australia. The seasons tend to be from September to April. There are a large number of tracks available Australia wide, with some of the most popular ones being Perth Motorplex, Bunbury Speedway, Speedway City, Premier Speedway Warrnambool (Sungold Stadium) and Sydney Speedway (trading as Valvoline Raceway). The richest and best known Speedway series in Australia is the World Series Sprintcars. The series was conceived by Adelaide based sedan driver and promoter John Hughes in 1986 as an Australian version of the famous World of Outlaws (WoO) series run in the United States since 1978. The most recent season was the 2014–15 World Series Sprintcars season.

There is also a single meeting Australian Sprintcar Championship which is run over 12 rounds during the Australian Speedway season (as of 2013–14). The Australian Sprintcar Championship has been contested every year since 1963. Only open to Australian Sprint Car drivers, the Championship is for winged 410ci cars. It is contested at a different track each season, on a state-by-state rotational basis. The 2015 Championship was held at Western Australia's Bunbury Speedway. The 2016 title will be held at Victoria's Premier Speedway. The most successful driver of the Championship's history is Garry Rush with 10 wins. Another popular annual event is the Australian Super Sedan Championship.

The composition of the dirt on tracks has an effect on the amount of grip available. Tracks can be composed of any of the following materials; clay, dirt, sand, Dolomite, crushed granite and crusher dust. Some tracks are also banked or semi-banked, although most are flat. The Ultimate Sprintcar Championship (USC) recently announced a new television show which will be broadcast on 7mate, which is the most comprehensive free-to-air deal in the history of a few premier Sprintcar venues. It will run from early November 2015 until the end of April 2016. The new program will be known as "Ultimate Sprintcar".

Motorcycle Speedway returns to Australia
Despite Australia being the birthplace of motorcycle speedway in 1923, and producing two World Champions since 2002 in Jason Crump (2004, 2006 and 2009) and Chris Holder (2012), as well as dual Under-21 World Champion Darcy Ward (2009, 2010), the Speedway Grand Prix of Australia has not returned to the Speedway Grand Prix calendar as of 2014.

This is set to change from 2015 with Docklands Stadium in Melbourne, a 53,359 seat stadium with a retractable roof and movable seating, signing a 5-year deal to host the event. The Grand Prix is set to be the 12th and final round of the 2015 Speedway Grand Prix series. Triple World Champion Jason Crump and ten time Australian Champion Leigh Adams will serve as Australian SGP ambassadors in 2015. The Australia national speedway team are one of the major teams in international motorcycle speedway with the country regarded as the birthplace of the sport in the 1920s. The current team is managed by former rider Mark Lemon, (who also managers the Australia national under-21 speedway team) and captained by 2012 World Champion Chris Holder. Australia finished 3rd in the 2014 Speedway World Cup Final on 2 August in Poland.

Of the 15 permanent riders of the SGP, three of them are Australian;
 Chris Holder
 Troy Batchelor
 Jason Doyle

Popular events
Some of the more notable and popular dirt track races include:

World Series Sprintcars

Australian Late Model Championship

Australian Speedcar Championship

Australian Sprintcar Championship

Australian Super Sedan Championship

Australian Street Stock Championship

Australian Compact Speedcar Championship

Australian Individual Speedway Championship

Australian Sidecar Speedway Championship

Australian Speedcar Grand Prix

Grand Annual Sprintcar Classic

Australian Sprintcar Grand Prix

Kings Challenge

National Super Sedan Series

Sidecar Grand Slam

Types of classes
There are several types of classes in Australian speedway including:
 Sprintcars
 Compact Speedcars (known as TQ Midgets elsewhere)
 Motorcycle speedway
 Sidecar speedway
 Stockcars
 Speedcars (known as Midgets elsewhere)
 Late model 
 Open sportsman
 Demolition derbys
 Wingless Sprints
 Formula 500
 Legend Cars
 Monster trucks
 Mod Lites
 V8 Dirt Modifieds
 SSA Street Stocks
 SSA Production Sedans
 SSA Junior Sedans
 SSA National 4s
 SSA Modified Sedans
 SSA Super Sedans

See also
 List of dirt track ovals in Australia

References

External links
Speedway Australia, Governing body